7 Boötis is a single star in the northern constellation of Boötes, located 590 light-years away from the Sun. It is barely visible to the naked eye as a dim, yellow-hued star with an apparent visual magnitude of 5.71. 7 Boötis is moving closer to the Earth with a heliocentric radial velocity of −11 km/s.

This is an evolved giant star with a stellar classification of G5 III, currently at the end of the Hertzsprung gap. The rotation rate is moderate, with a projected rotational velocity of 14.5 km/s. It has four times the mass of the Sun and has expanded to 19 times the Sun's radius. The star is radiating 229 times the Sun's luminosity from its enlarged photosphere at an effective temperature of 4,600 K.

References

G-type giants
Boötes
Durchmusterung objects
Bootis, 07
121107
067787
5225